Nicholas ("Nick") Alfred Neckles (born 24 November 1978 in Bridgetown, Barbados) is a 3-time Olympic swimmer from Barbados. He swam for Barbados at the 1996, 2000, and 2004 Olympics. Heckles also competed at the 1999, 2003 and 2007 Pan American Games

As of April 2009, he holds the Barbadian Record in the 50, 100 and 200 backstroke.

He also competed/attended college at Scotland's University of Stirling.

At the 2006 Central American and Caribbean Games, he set the Games Records in the 200 backstroke (2:00.85), bettering the 2:01.53 swum by Cuba's Neisser Bent at the 1998 Games in Maracaibo, Venezuela. Neckles time also set the Barbadian Record.

References

1978 births
Living people
Barbadian male swimmers
Swimmers at the 1994 Commonwealth Games
Swimmers at the 1996 Summer Olympics
Swimmers at the 1999 Pan American Games
Swimmers at the 2000 Summer Olympics
Swimmers at the 2002 Commonwealth Games
Swimmers at the 2003 Pan American Games
Swimmers at the 2004 Summer Olympics
Olympic swimmers of Barbados
Swimmers at the 2006 Commonwealth Games
Sportspeople from Bridgetown
Pan American Games competitors for Barbados
Commonwealth Games competitors for Barbados
Competitors at the 2006 Central American and Caribbean Games
Competitors at the 2010 Central American and Caribbean Games
Central American and Caribbean Games gold medalists for Barbados
Central American and Caribbean Games silver medalists for Barbados
Central American and Caribbean Games medalists in swimming